Georg Sjøht (born 21 June 1901, date of death unknown) was a Danish rower. He competed in the men's eight event at the 1928 Summer Olympics.

References

1901 births
Year of death missing
Danish male rowers
Olympic rowers of Denmark
Rowers at the 1928 Summer Olympics
Rowers from Copenhagen